Michael Garrett Mills (born October 12, 1983) is a former American football tight end. He was drafted by the New England Patriots in the fourth round of the 2006 NFL Draft. He played college football at Tulsa.

Mills also played for the Minnesota Vikings, Philadelphia Eagles, and Cincinnati Bengals.

Early years
Mills attended Jenks High School in Jenks, Oklahoma and was a good student and a standout in football and basketball. In football, he led his teams to three Class 6A State Titles, was a three-year starter as a tight end, and as a senior he was named the District Player of the Year and he was named the Tulsa World News Player of the Year. In basketball, Mills was a three-year letterman. Mills graduated from Jenks High School in 2003.

College career
He played college football for the University of Tulsa, where he set an NCAA record in the 2005 season with 1,235 yards receiving (on 87 receptions), the most yards earned receiving by a tight end in a single season. He won the MVP for the 2005 C-USA Championship game and was an All-America selection.

Professional career

First stint with Patriots
Mills was drafted in the fourth round (pick 106 overall) of the 2006 NFL Draft by the Patriots. He was not expected to play solely at tight end in the NFL (unlike David Thomas, the Texas tight end the Patriots drafted just before Mills); the Patriots' depth chart once listed him at both tight end and fullback.

Given that Mills was fourth on the Patriots' depth chart at tight end, he did not see any playing time during the regular season, and was placed on injured reserve in the middle of the 2006 season.

On September 1, 2007, the Patriots released Mills.

Minnesota Vikings
Mills was claimed off waivers on September 2, 2007 by the Minnesota Vikings and made his regular season debut in the season finale against the Denver Broncos and had his first career reception. Mills was released by the Vikings on September 4, 2010 as part of final cuts in preparation for the beginning of the 2010 NFL season.

Philadelphia Eagles
Mills was signed to the Philadelphia Eagles' practice squad on September 6, 2010. He was promoted to the active roster on September 13. He was waived on December 21.

Cincinnati Bengals
Mills was claimed off waivers by the Cincinnati Bengals on December 22, 2010. He was waived on August 16, 2011.

Second stint with Patriots
Mills was claimed off waivers by the Patriots on August 21, but was waived again on August 29. Mills re-signed to the Patriots practice squad on September 14, 2011.

References

External links
Philadelphia Eagles bio

1983 births
Living people
Sportspeople from Tulsa, Oklahoma
Players of American football from Oklahoma
American football fullbacks
American football tight ends
Tulsa Golden Hurricane football players
New England Patriots players
Minnesota Vikings players
Philadelphia Eagles players
Cincinnati Bengals players